The Cafe Irreal is an Internet journal dedicated to the publication and propagation of irrealist literature.

History and profile
Online since 1998, it has published a number of notable authors whose work sometimes fits into this non-realist genre, such as Charles Simic, Ignacio Padilla, Elaine Vilar Madruga, and Pavel Řezníček. It has published a number of authors in translation, especially from Spanish and (as it is partially based in Prague) from Czech. In this connection, translations that have originally appeared in The Cafe Irreal have been included in the Norton anthology Sudden Fiction Latino and Litteraria Pragensia's The Return of Král Majáles: Prague's International Literary Renaissance 1990-2010.

In 2008, the coeditors of The Cafe Irreal were nominated for a World Fantasy Special Award—Non-professional for their work on the journal, and in that same year the journal was named one of the 25 best places to get published online by Writer's Digest magazine.

According to the back cover blurb on its 15th anniversary print anthology (November 2013), the publication had published stories by more than 250 authors from over 30 different countries.

See also
 Irrealism (the arts)

References

Sources
 Evans, G.S. and Alice Whittenburg, "After Kafka: Kafka Criticism and Scholarship as a Resource in an Attempt to Promulgate a New Literary Genre," Journal of the Kafka Society of America, 31/32(1+2):18-26.
 Evans, G.S. and Alice Whittenburg, (eds.), The Irreal Reader: Fiction & Essays from The Cafe Irreal, Bowie, MD: Guide Dog Books, 2013, .

External links
 The Cafe Irreal website

Czech literature websites
American literature websites
Magazines established in 1998
Literary magazines published in the United States
Online literary magazines published in the United States
Quarterly magazines published in the United States